The 2008 Peterborough City Council election took place on 1 May 2008 to elect members of Peterborough City Council in England. This was on the same day as other local elections.

Election result

References

2008
2000s in Cambridgeshire
Peterborough